The men's 200 metres at the 2000 Summer Olympics, as part of the athletics programme, was held at Stadium Australia on Wednesday 27 September and Thursday 28 September 2000. There were 67 competitors from 50 nations. The event was won by Konstantinos Kenteris of Greece, the nation's first medal in the event. Darren Campbell's silver was Great Britain's first men's 200 metres medal since 1980 and matched the nation's best result in the event (third silver with no golds). Ato Boldon of Trinidad and Tobago repeated as bronze medalist, the ninth man to earn multiple medals in the 200 metres.

Background

This was the 23rd appearance of the event, which was not held at the first Olympics in 1896 but has been on the program ever since. Two of the eight finalists from the 1996 Games returned: bronze medalist Ato Boldon of Trinidad and Tobago and fourth-place finisher Obadele Thompson of Barbados. Boldon had won the 1997 World Championship; Maurice Greene of the United States won in 1999. Neither Greene nor reigning Olympic champion and world record holder Michael Johnson, both suffering from minor injuries, made the U.S. team in the 200 metres (though they did in other events).

Dominica, Kazakhstan, Saint Kitts and Nevis, and Slovakia each made their debut in the event. The United States made its 22nd appearance, most of any nation, having missed only the boycotted 1980 Games.

Qualification

The qualification period for athletics took place between 1 January 1999 to 11 September 2000. For the men's 200 metres, each National Olympic Committee was permitted to enter up to three athletes that had run the race in 20.70 seconds or faster during the qualification period. If an NOC had no athletes that qualified under that standard, one athlete that had run the race in 20.90 seconds or faster could be entered.

The maximum number of athletes per nation had been set at 3 since the 1930 Olympic Congress.

Competition format

The competition used the four round format introduced in 1920: heats, quarterfinals, semifinals, and a final. The "fastest loser" system introduced in 1960 was used in the heats.

There were 9 heats of 7 or 8 runners each, with the top 3 men in each advancing to the quarterfinals along with the next 5 fastest overall. The quarterfinals consisted of 4 heats of 8 athletes each; the 4 fastest men in each heat advanced to the semifinals. There were 2 semifinals, each with 8 runners. The top 4 athletes in each semifinal advanced. The final had 8 runners. The races were run on a 400-metre track.

Records

These were the standing world and Olympic records (in seconds) prior to the Olympics.

No new world or Olympic records were set during the competition.

Schedule

All times are Australian Eastern Standard Time (UTC+10)

Results

All times shown are in seconds.

Heats

Heat 1

Heat 2

Heat 3

Heat 4

Heat 5

Heat 6

Heat 7

Heat 8

Heat 9

Heats overall results

Quarterfinals

Quarterfinal 1

Quarterfinal 2

Quarterfinal 3

Quarterfinal 4

Quarterfinals overall results

Semifinals

Semifinal 1

Semifinal 2

Final

References

Source: Official Report of the 2000 Sydney Summer Olympics available at https://web.archive.org/web/20080522105330/http://www.la84foundation.org/5va/reports_frmst.htm

200 metres, Men's
200 metres at the Olympics
Men's events at the 2000 Summer Olympics